Jesús ‘Txus’ Alba Ramos (born 31 March 2003) is a Spanish footballer who plays as a midfielder for FC Barcelona Atlètic.

Career
Alba started at the academy of RCD Espanyol in 2010 where he stayed for four seasons before moving on to CF Damm. He rejoined Espanyol before then moving to FC Barcelona in 2018. Barca paid their city rivals €50,000 for his services. Alba was recognised as one of the best talents in the Barcelona youth sides, even as he adjusted to a new more central midfield position than he had at Espanyol. Alba signed on to play for FC Barcelona Atlètic for the 2022–23 and 2023-24 seasons. He has continued his progress under newly appointed Barcelona Atletic manager Rafael Marquez and Alba’s regular age group partner Marc Casadó playing alongside him in central midfield.

Style of play
Alba is gathering a reputation  for his vision, passing, and ability to assist and score at dead-ball situations. He is praised for being two-footed and having good balance allowing him to dribble with the ball.

International career
In 2020 made his debut appearances for the Spanish U18 football team as he played in matches against the Turkish U18 and Romanian U18 sides.

Career statistics

Club

References

External links
 
 

2003 births
Living people
Spanish footballers
Association football midfielders
Sportspeople from the Province of Barcelona
Footballers from Catalonia
FC Barcelona Atlètic players
Primera Federación players
Spain youth international footballers